Metro Pictures Corporation was a motion picture production company founded in 1915 in the United States. It was, along with Goldwyn Pictures and Louis B. Mayer Pictures Corporation, one of the forerunners of Metro-Goldwyn-Mayer. The company produced its films in New York, Los Angeles, and sometimes at leased facilities in Fort Lee, New Jersey. Metro Pictures was founded as a film distribution company in February 1915 by a number of "exchange men" with Richard A. Rowland  as president, George Grombacher as vice-president and Louis B. Mayer  as secretary. It soon also began producing its own films, with Sealed Valley being Metro's first production, which was released on August 2, 1915.

Metro's list of stars during its existence included Mae Murray, Viola Dana, Lionel and Ethel Barrymore, Emmy Wehlen, Emily Stevens, Lillian Gish, Buster Keaton, Jackie Coogan, Marion Davies, Ramon Novarro, Wallace Beery and Lewis Stone. The romantic teams of Francis X. Bushman and Beverly Bayne and Harold Lockwood and May Allison also worked for Metro.

In 1919, the company was purchased by Marcus Loew as a supplier of product for his theater chain. Several years later, in 1924, Loew merged it with his recently acquired Goldwyn Pictures, followed shortly thereafter with another merge with Louis B. Mayer Productions. The resulting entity was named Metro-Goldwyn-Mayer in 1925 with Mayer in charge.

1910s

1920s

References 

Metro Pictures films
Metro
Metro